Dan Madigan is an American television producer, author and screenwriter. He is known for his work in the professional wrestling industry, including writing and producing for WWE Smackdown.

Works

Madigan wrote the script and novel tie-in for WWE Films' See No Evil (2006).

References

External links

Living people
American male screenwriters
American television producers
American television writers
American male television writers
Year of birth missing (living people)